Surface mail, also known as sea mail, is mail that is transported by land and sea (along the surface of the earth), rather than by air, as in airmail. Surface mail is significantly less expensive but slower than airmail, and thus is preferred for large or heavy, non-urgent items and is primarily used for sending packages, not letters.

History 
The term "surface mail" arose as a retronym (retrospective term), following the development of airmail – a term was needed to describe traditional mail, for which purpose "surface mail" was coined. A more recent example of the same process is the term snail mail (to refer to physical mail, be it transported by surface or air), following the development of email.

By country

Israel 
The Israel Postal Company offers international surface mail (known as "sea and land mail,".

United States 
In 2007, the US Postal Service discontinued its outbound international surface mail ("sea mail") service, mainly because of increased costs. Returned undeliverable surface parcels had become an expensive problem for the USPS, since it was often required to take such parcels back.

Domestic surface mail (now "Retail Ground" or "Commercial Parcel Select") remains available.

Alternatives to international surface mail include:

 International Surface Air Lift (ISAL). The service includes neither tracking nor insurance; but it may be possible to purchase shipping insurance from a third-party company.
 USPS Commercial ePacket. The service is trackable.
 Ordinary first-class international airmail.

Senders can access the International Surface Air Lift and ePacket services through postal wholesalers. Some examples of such wholesalers include:

 Asendia USA (accessible through the Shippo website to users who have an Asendia account),
 Globegistics (now owned by Asendia), and
 APC Postal Logistics.

If a sender sends an ISAL mailing directly through the USPS (without a wholesaler as an intermediary), the minimum weight is 50 pounds per mailing. ePacket mailings can never be sent directly through the USPS; senders must always use a wholesaler.

See also 

 Parcel post
 Surface transport

References

External links 
 Royal Mail: Surface Mail

Postal systems
Philatelic terminology